Bonaya Adhi Godana (September 2, 1952 in Dukana, Ethiopia – April 10, 2006 in Marsabit, Kenya) was the foreign minister of Kenya from January 1998 until 2001.

From 2002 to his death in 2006 he was the deputy leader of the opposition Kenya African National Union (KANU) party. He was the Member of Parliament for North Horr Constituency. He died on April 10, 2006, in a Kenya Air Force plane crash near Marsabit. 13 other people were also killed in the crash while three survived. Among the other casualties were several other government officials including two assistant cabinet ministers who were political rivals of Godana. The politicians and religious leaders were on a mission to secure peace along the Ethiopian border. A decade earlier, on July 28, 1996, he survived a helicopter crash at the same Marsabit airstrip.
 
He graduated as Master of Law from University of Nairobi in 1976, and PHD of International Law from Graduate Institute of International Studies in Geneva in 1984. He was first elected to the National Assembly of Kenya in 1988.

References

External links
 
 
 

1952 births
2006 deaths
Government ministers of Kenya
Kenya African National Union politicians
Ministers of Agriculture of Kenya
Kenyan expatriates in Switzerland
Graduate Institute of International and Development Studies alumni
Victims of aviation accidents or incidents in Kenya
Victims of aviation accidents or incidents in 2006